Francesco Borello (16 January 1902 – 9 May 1979) was an Italian professional footballer who played as a striker.

He played for 10 seasons for U.S. Pro Vercelli Calcio.

He played his only game for the Italy national football team on 9 March 1924 in a game against Spain.

External links
 

1902 births
1979 deaths
People from Vercelli
Italian footballers
Italy international footballers
Serie A players
F.C. Pro Vercelli 1892 players

Association football forwards
A.S.D. La Biellese players